Andrei Novikov (born on 27 March 1982) is an Estonian politician. He was a member of XIII Riigikogu and has been the Deputy Mayor of Tallinn since 9 November 2017.

References

Living people
1982 births
Estonian Centre Party politicians
Members of the Riigikogu, 2015–2019
Politicians from Tallinn
Estonian people of Russian descent